The 2020 IIHF Women's World Championship Division III was an international ice hockey tournament organised by the International Ice Hockey Federation.

The tournament was held in Sofia, Bulgaria, from 4 to 10 December 2019.

South Africa won the tournament and were promoted to Division II.

Participants

Match officials
Four referees and seven linesmen are selected for the tournament.

Final standings

Results
All times are local (UTC+2).

Awards and statistics

Awards

Scoring leaders
List shows the top skaters sorted by points, then goals.

GP = Games played; G = Goals; A = Assists; Pts = Points; +/− = Plus/minus; PIM = Penalties in minutes; POS = Position
Source: IIHF.com

Goaltending leaders
Only the top five goaltenders, based on save percentage, who have played at least 40% of their team's minutes, are included in this list.

TOI = Time on Ice (minutes:seconds); SA = Shots against; GA = Goals against; GAA = Goals against average; Sv% = Save percentage; SO = Shutouts
Source: IIHF.com

References

External links
Official website of IIHF

2020
Division III
2020 IIHF Women's World Championship Division III
Sports competitions in Sofia
2020 in Bulgarian sport
December 2019 sports events in Europe